Ethyl tertiary-butyl ether (ETBE), also known as ethyl tert-butyl ether, is commonly used as an oxygenate gasoline additive in the production of gasoline from crude oil.  ETBE offers equal or greater air quality benefits than ethanol, while being technically and logistically less challenging. Unlike ethanol, ETBE does not induce evaporation of gasoline, which is one of the causes of smog, and does not absorb moisture from the atmosphere.

Production 
Ethyl tert-butyl ether is manufactured industrially by the acidic etherification of isobutylene with ethanol at a temperature of 30–110 °C and a pressure of 0,8–1,3 MPa. The reaction is carried out with an acidic ion-exchange resin as a catalyst.

Suitable reactors are fixed-bed reactors such as tube bundle or circulation reactors in which the reflux can be cooled optionally.

Ethanol, produced by fermentation and distillation, is more expensive than methanol, which is derived from natural gas. Therefore, MTBE, made from methanol is cheaper than ETBE, made from ethanol.

See also 
Methyl tert-butyl ether (MTBE) 
tert-Amyl methyl ether (TAME) 
Tetraethyllead (TEL)
List of gasoline additives

References

External links
 EC Joint Research Centre ETBE risk assessment report
 Directive 98/70/EC of the European Parliament and of the Council of 13 October 1998 relating to the quality of petrol and diesel fuels and amending Council Directive 93/12/EEC
 An assessment of the impact of ethanol-blended petrol on the total NMVOC emission from road transport in selected countries

Commodity chemicals
Dialkyl ethers
Ether solvents
Oxygenates
Pollutants
Tert-butyl compounds